Plato's Academy is a 2009 Greek-German comedy-drama film directed by Filippos Tsitos, starring Antonis Kafetzopoulos, Anastas Kozdine, Titika Saringouli, Kostas Koronaios, Panayiotis Stamatakis and Maria Zorba.

Cast
 Antonis Kafetzopoulos as Stavros
 Anastas Kozdine as Marenglen
 Titika Saringouli as Harikleia
  as Nikos
 Kostas Koronaios as Argyris
 Panayiotis Stamatakis as Thymios
 Maria Zorba as Dina
 Platonas Brakoulias
 Maria Stefou
 Konstadina Tzortzi
 Nikos Zoiopoulos

Release
The film premiered at the 2009 Locarno Festival and was a finalist for the 2010 Lux Prize.

Reception
Joseph Proimakis of  wrote that the film "mercilessly bites into one of the darkest traits of any modern multicultural society and turns it on its head, all the while holding onto its humanistic sensibilities and maintaining a delicate balance between the universal social commentary and the specificity of the hero’s story."

Kirk Honeycutt of The Hollywood Reporter wrote that the film offers "wry wisdom and steady laughs in its acute observation about a formerly heterogeneous society’s confrontation with otherness."

Jay Weissberg of Variety called the film a "weak comedy with few laughs and little insight."

References

External links
 
 

Greek comedy-drama films
German comedy-drama films
2009 comedy-drama films